In the Tour de France, one of the three Grand Tours of professional stage cycling, the yellow jersey is given to the leader of the general classification. The Tour de France is the most famous road cycling event in the world, and is held annually in the month of July. Although all riders compete together, the winners of the Tour are divided into classifications, each best known by the coloured jersey that is worn by the leader of it; the general classification (GC), represented by the maillot jaune (yellow jersey), is for the overall leader in terms of the lowest time. The other individual classifications in the Tour de France are the points classification, also known as the sprinters' classification (green jersey), the mountains classification (polka dot jersey), and the young rider classification (white jersey).

The first Tour de France was in 1903, but the first Dutch cyclists started only in 1936. Already in that first year, Theo Middelkamp won a stage, but it would take until 1951 before Wim van Est was the first Dutch cyclists to wear the yellow jersey. Between 1989 and 2019, the yellow jersey has never been worn by a Dutch cyclist.

List
"Obtained" refers to the date and stage where the rider secured the lead of the general classification at the finish; the rider would first wear the yellow jersey in the stage after, where he would start the day as leader. "Relinquished" refers to the date and stage where the rider lost the lead, and therefore was not wearing the yellow jersey the following stage.

See also
List of Australian cyclists who have led the Tour de France general classification
List of Belgian cyclists who have led the Tour de France general classification
List of British cyclists who have led the Tour de France general classification
Yellow jersey statistics

Notes

A. : The first time a Dutch cyclist wore the yellow jersey. Van Est had to give up after falling.
B. : Janssen was the first Dutch winner of the Tour de France.
C. : Wagtmans was leader after the split stage 1B, but not anymore after 1C. In some references, this is not counted as a day in the lead.
D. : P indicates the prologue.
E. : Jan Raas had also won the prologue, but the tour organisation decided not to count that prologue for the general classification because the weather had changed during the race.
F. : Zoetemelk was upgraded to first place after Michel Pollentier was caught in a doping incident.
G. : Zoetemelk was the second Dutch winner of the Tour de France.

References

External links

Lists of cyclists
Tour de France-related lists
Cycle racing in the Netherlands
Tour de France people